Artemisin is a sesquiterpene lactone, similar in structure to α-santonin.

See also 
 Artemisia (genus), hardy herbaceous plants and shrubs known for the powerful chemical constituents in their essential oils
 Artemisinin, a group of drugs used against malaria
 Santonin, an anthelminthic, drug expelling parasitic worms (helminths) by paralyzing them

References

External links

Sesquiterpene lactones